Stephan Rhode (born 5 October 1968) is a German former professional tennis player.

Rhode, who comes from Essen, turned professional in 1989.

His best performance on the ATP Tour came at the Swiss Open in 1992, where he beat Andrei Medvedev to make the second round. He reached his career best ranking that year of 274 in the world.

In 1993 he featured in the qualifying draws for the Australian Open, French Open and Wimbledon.

References

External links
 
 

1968 births
Living people
West German male tennis players
German male tennis players
Sportspeople from Essen
Tennis people from North Rhine-Westphalia